A counter-arch is built adjacent to another arch to oppose its forces or help stabilize it.

See also
 Flying arch
 Flying buttress
 Inverted arch

References

Arches and vaults